Pathibhara Devi (in Nepali: पाथिभरा देवी मन्दिर, in Limbu: Mukkumlung) is one of the most significant temples in Nepal, located on the hill of Taplejung. It is also considered one of the holy places for the Nepalese people. Worshippers from different parts of Nepal and India visit the temple during special occasions, as it is believed that a pilgrimage to the temple ensures the fulfillment of the pilgrims' wishes.

It serves as a secondary route of Kanchenjunga trek. The list of devotees includes the ex-Royal family of Nepal. The pilgrims offer animal sacrifices, gold and silver to please the goddess.

Pathibhara Temple is also a side route to the Kanchenjunga Base Camp Trek.

Legend 
It is believed that local shepherds lost hundreds of their sheep while grazing at the same place where the temple stands today. The distressed shepherds had a dream in which the goddess ordered them to carry out ritualistic sacrifice of sheep and build a shrine in her honour. When the sacrifice was offered, the lost herd suddenly returned. The ritual of offering sacrifices inside the temple is believed to have started after the incident.

The hill goddess Pathibhara after which the place is named is believed by the devotees to be a fierce goddess who can be easily pleased with simple and selfless act of compassion, prayer and sacrificial offerings (sacrifice in Hinduism denotes sacrifice of one's ego and greed); while is unmerciful and severe to one who has malicious intentions beneath.

She answers prayers and is very important to all people residing in Nepal. The Goddess at Pathibhara is believed to fulfil the long-cherished dreams of her devotees, like sons for those without sons, and wealth for the poor.

Pathibhara is also one of the 'Shakti Peeths'. Shakti Peethas are the places where parts of Goddess Sati had fallen while Lord Shiva was carrying her dead body. Worshippers from different parts of Nepal and India visit the temple during special occasions, as it is believed that a pilgrimage to the temple ensures fulfilment of all that the pilgrim desires

Attractions and activities
Pilgrims can also visit monasteries situated in Olangchung Gola and Lungchung. The waterfall at Sawa and the pond of Timbung, during autumn and spring are worth visiting every year. The forest ecosystem along the trial offers diversity of wildlife, birds, flowers and butterflies. The whole of the Kanchanjunga range can be seen in this trek.

Natural View Tower

From the Pathibhara hill, which is also being developed as a natural lookout tower, the view of the beautiful  gorges formed by the silver-shining mountain range to the north is breathtaking. Mt. Kangchenjunga and Kumbhakarna can be interviewed right in front of the eyes, while the mountains like Mount Everest, Lhotse, Choyu, Makalu can be seen from a height of eight thousand meters. Similarly, most of Panchthar and Ilam, Tehrathum, Sankhuwasabha and Solu including Fungling Bazaar as well as various parts of Sikkim and West Bengal of India can be seen.

Trek
For tourists other than pilgrims, the Limbu Cultural Trek in the region is considered equally enthralling. A week-long trek passes through ethnic villages of Taplejung, such as; Phurunga (or Phurumbu), Limkhim, Khewang, Tellok, PhawaKhola and Mamankhe.

How to get there
Pathibhara lies in Yangwarak Rural Municipality. The journey to Pathibhara starts from Suketar, which is about a 20-minute drive from Phungling Bazaar, and then 1–2 hours' drive from Suketar to Kafle Pati. Pathibhara Devi is about 3–4 hours' walk from Kafle Pati.

Suketar Airport at Suketar is the only STOL airport in Taplejung district, connecting Kathmandu and Biratnagar by scheduled flights.

Pathibhara trail passes through Deurali, Ramitedanda, Chhatedhunga, Bhalugaunda and Phedi before finally reaching the temple. Residents along the trail offer food and lodging facilities. Basic accommodation facilities are also available for pilgrims near the temple premises.

The best time to visit the temple is during pre-monsoon (March to June) and post-monsoon (September to November) seasons.

References

External links
 

Pathivara Temple

Hindu temples in Koshi Province
Shakti Peethas
Buildings and structures in Taplejung District
Limbu people
Hindu temples practicing animal sacrifice